The Redfern Nieuport 17/24 is an American homebuilt aircraft that was designed by Walter Redfern and produced by the Walter Redfern Company of Post Falls, Idaho, based upon the First World War Nieuport 17 and Nieuport 24 fighter aircraft. When it was available the aircraft was supplied in the form of plans for amateur construction.

The plans allow a builder to complete the aircraft as either a Nieuport 17 or Nieuport 24.

Design and development
The Nieuport 17/24 features a biplane layout, a single-seat open cockpit, fixed conventional landing gear with and a single engine in tractor configuration.

The replica is built from a combination of wood and metal tubing, all covered in doped aircraft fabric. The tail is also cable-braced.

Changes over the original aircraft design include the addition of main wheel brakes and a tailwheel, whereas the original aircraft had no brakes and fitted a tailskid.

The manufacturer estimated the construction time from the supplied plans as 2000 hours.

Operational history
By 1998 the company reported that 100 aircraft were completed and flying.

Specifications (Nieuport 17/24)

References

External links
Photo of a Redfern Nieuport 17/24 in flight

Nieuport 17 24
1990s United States sport aircraft
Single-engined tractor aircraft
Biplanes
Homebuilt aircraft
Replica aircraft